Night Train is an EP by English rock band Keane. The EP's title and material was born out of the group's Perfect Symmetry World Tour of 2008–2009.

Night Train debuted at number 1 on the UK Albums Chart.

Recording
The EP was recorded in various studios during the Perfect Symmetry World tour, and mastered at Abbey Road Studios. Tracks "Stop for a Minute" and "Looking Back" mark Keane's collaboration with Somali/Canadian rapper K'Naan. "I think those tracks show us in a completely different light," says Keane frontman Tom Chaplin. "Your Love" features Tim Rice-Oxley on lead vocals.
On 3 February, it was confirmed that the lead single for the EP would be "Stop for a Minute". On 8 March 2010 the song "Clear Skies" was played by Steve Lamacq on BBC 6 Music radio station, making it the first song of the EP to be played on radio. On 11 March 2010 the first single from the EP, "Stop for a Minute", made its debut on Fearne Cotton's BBC Radio 1 show. The song reached the UK Top 40.

Keane's London-based manager Adam Tudhope says the EP "may be a mix of styles and genres of music, but it's full of the hallmarks that make Keane..."

Reception

Night Train has been met with mixed reviews from critics.  Ryan Brockington of the New York Post PopWrap called the work, "game changing" while writing that the first single, "Stop for a Minute", is "just as brilliant" as the album.

John Aizlewood of Q magazine called Night Trains "8 tracks and 31 minutes... surprisingly effective between-albums stop-gap".

Track listing

PersonnelKeane Tom Chaplin: lead vocals, guitar
 Tim Rice-Oxley: keyboards, bass guitar, guitar, percussion, lead vocals (track 6), backing vocals
 Richard Hughes: drums, percussion, backing vocalsAdditional Musicians'''
 Jesse Quin: bass guitar, guitar, backing vocals
 Jerry Clack: brass (track 7)
 Roland Neffe: vibraphone (track 4)
 K'naan: vocals (tracks 3 and 7)
 Tigarah: vocals (track 5)

Charts and certifications
The Night Train'' EP debuted on the UK Albums Chart on 16 May 2010 at number one with sales of 28,000 copies. The Album is certified Silver in UK selling over 60,000 copies and has sold worldwide over 160,000 copies to date.

Charts

Sales and certifications

References

Keane (band) albums
2010 EPs